Impaction may refer to:
Impaction (animals), blockage of the digestive tract of animals
Fecal impaction, the presence of a solid, immobile bulk of human feces that can develop in the rectum
Dental impaction, the failure of teeth fully to erupt into the mouth because of obstruction from another tooth
Aerosol impaction

See also 
 Impact (disambiguation)